Mario & Zelda Big Band Live CD is a recording of a live big band performance of songs based on the Mario and The Legend of Zelda game series. The performance was at Nihon Seinenkan Hall on September 14, 2003. There were many artists who performed during this concert.

Track listing 
 Ashura Benimaru Itoh - "Opening Theme of Mario" - 2:24
 The Big Band of Rogues - "Super Mario 64" - 4:41
 The Big Band of Rogues & Koji Kondo - "Medley of Super Mario Bros." - 4:25
 The Big Band of Rogues - "Mario Scat Version" - 2:07
 The Big Band of Rogues & Seiko - "Go Go Mario" - 3:37
 The Big Band of Rogues - "Super Mario Bros. 3 Ending Theme" - 2:43
 Yoshihiro Arita With His Band - "Theme of Athletic" - 4:18
 Yoshihiro Arita & Kazumi Totaka - "Yoshi on the Beach" - 3:13
 Yoshihiro Arita With His Band - "Legend of Zelda" - 7:28
 Yoshihiro Arita With His Band - "Theme of Dragon Roost Island" - 4:22
 Yoshihiro Arita With His Band & Seiko - "Song of Epona" - 4:06
 Yoshihiro Arita With His Band - "Theme of The Dolphic Town" - 4:28
 The Big Band of Rogues - "Zora Band" - 4:43
 The Big Band of Rogues - "Theme of Goron City" - 3:53
 The Big Band of Rogues - "Theme of The Shop" - 3:19
 The Big Band of Rogues - "Medley of The Legend Of Zelda" - 4:32
 The Big Band of Rogues - "Ending Theme of Super Mario Sunshine" - 4:30
 All Stars - "Encore (Slider)" - 6:39

References

2003 live albums
Mario (franchise) music
The Legend of Zelda